Chromohalobacter salexigens is a gram negative, oxidase and catalase positive, rod shaped, motile and moderately halophilic species of marine bacteria. It was isolated from Bonaire, Netherlands Antilles and from marine sponges of the Saint Martin's Island area of the Bay of Bengal, Bangladesh. Colonies are medium-sized, round and yellowish in color. The type strain is DSM 3043T (= ATCC BAA-138T = CECT 5384T = CCM4921T = CIP106854T = NCIMB 13768T). Its genome has been sequenced.  It is a gamma-Proteobacterium, and as such, closely related to Pseudomonas and Escherichia coli .

References

Further reading

External links

LPSN
Type strain of Chromohalobacter salexigens at BacDive -  the Bacterial Diversity Metadatabase

Oceanospirillales
Bacteria described in 2001